Eugene Andrew Burcher (born April 10, 1966) is a United States Navy rear admiral who serves as the director of Reserve Expeditionary Force Generation of the United States Navy, with additional duty as vice commander of the United States Fleet Forces Command since October 1, 2021. He most recently served as the Deputy Chief of Staff for Submarines of the NATO Maritime Command and Commander of Submarines of the North Atlantic Treaty Organization from July 19, 2019 to July 2021. Previously, he served as the Reserve Deputy Commander of Submarine Force Atlantic.

Born and raised in Alexandria, Virginia, Burcher earned a B.S. degree in mechanical engineering from the United States Naval Academy in 1988. He later received an M.B.A. degree from the Rensselaer Polytechnic Institute in 1995 and a J.D. degree from the University of Richmond in 1997. Burcher transitioned to the Navy Reserve in 1999.

Burcher married fellow University of Richmond law student Julia Burke Riley on August 9, 1997 in Alexandria, Virginia. They have a daughter and two sons. In 2021, their daughter was commissioned as a Navy ensign by her father before reporting to flight school.

References

External links
 

1966 births
Living people
People from Alexandria, Virginia
United States Naval Academy alumni
Rensselaer Polytechnic Institute alumni
University of Richmond School of Law alumni
Virginia lawyers
United States Navy reservists
Recipients of the Legion of Merit
United States Navy admirals